Chand Bardai was an Indian poet who composed Prithviraj Raso, an epic poem in Brajbhasa about the life of the Chahamana king Prithviraj Chauhan. The poem presents him as a court poet of Prithviraj. According to it, after Prithviraj was defeated at the Second battle of Tarain and taken to Ghazna by Muhammad of Ghor, Chand Bardai travelled to Ghazna and helped Prithviraj kill Muhammad. However, this is a fictional narrative not corroborated by any historical evidence.

The Prithviraj Raso was embellished with time and quite a few authors added to it. Only parts of the original manuscript are still intact. There are many versions of Raso but scholars agree that the biggest canto is considered the part of original "Prithivraj Raso". In its longest form the poem comprises upwords of 10,000 stanzas. Prithviraj Raso was proved historically unreliable and inaccurate by historians like Georg Bühler, Morrison, GH Ojha and Munshi Devi Prasad.<ref
name="AyyappappanikkarAkademi1997"></ref>

See also
 Hindi Literature
 Prithviraj Chauhan
 Adrishya

References

Bibliography

External links
 Chand Bardai at Kavita Kosh (Hindi)

History of Rajasthan
Indian male poets
Hindi-language poets
Poets from Rajasthan
12th-century Indian poets